The 2010 Honolulu special mayoral election was held on September 18, 2010.  The election coincided with Hawaii's primary election.  The winner of the election, Peter Carlisle, filled the unexpired term of former Democratic Honolulu Mayor Mufi Hannemann, who resigned on July 20, 2010 to run in the 2010 election for Governor of Hawaii.

Honolulu Managing Director Kirk Caldwell was acting Mayor of Honolulu on July 20, 2010, following Hannemann's resignation, until the special election was held.

Special election background
Mayor Mufi Hannemann was re-elected to a second term in the 2008 mayoral election. In 2010, he announced his intention seek the Democratic nomination for Governor of Hawaii in the gubernatorial election. Under Hawaii's resign-to-run law, Hannemann had to resign as Mayor of Honolulu in order to pursue election to another office in the state.

Mayor Hannemann resigned from office on July 20, 2010, and formally became a candidate for Governor of Hawaii. Hanneman's resignation necessitated a special mayoral election to fill the remainder of the mayor's unexpired term.

The Honolulu City Council set the date for the mayoral election for September 18, 2010.

Candidates

Kirk Caldwell - acting Mayor of Honolulu
Peter Carlisle - Honolulu city prosecutor and lawyer
Panos D. Prevedouros - University of Hawaii engineering professor
Rod Tam - Honolulu city councilman

Withdrawn
Donovan Dela Cruz - two-term Honolulu city councilman

Polls
An August 2010 poll conducted by Hawaii News Now and the Star-Advertiser showed Peter Carlisle at 49 percent, Kirk Caldwell with 25 percent, Panos Prevedouros with 11 percent, and Rod Tam being favored by 4 percent of potential voters.
Carlisle won the election.

Results

References

2010 Hawaii elections
Mayoral elections in Honolulu
2010 United States mayoral elections
United States mayoral special elections
Honolulu mayoral 2010